Left coast is a colloquial expression for the politics and culture of the West Coast of the United States. It may also refer to:
"Left Coast", a weekly cartoon by Ted Rall
"Left Coast", part of the city of Mosul, Iraq, on the east bank of the Tigris river
Left Coast Crime, an annual mystery fiction convention
Left Coast Lifter, a barge used to rebuild the San Francisco–Oakland Bay Bridge
Left Coast Press, a scholarly publisher now part of Routledge